Metriocnemus is a genus of non-biting midges in the subfamily Orthocladiinae of the bloodworm family Chironomidae.

Species

M. acutus Sæther, 1995
M. aequalis Johannsen, 1934
M. albolineatus (Meigen, 1818)
M. atratulus (Zetterstedt, 1850)
M. atriclava Kieffer, 1921
M. beringiensis (Cranston & Oliver, 1988)
M. brusti Sæther, 1989
M. calvescens Sæther, 1995
M. carmencitabertarum Langton & Cobo, 1997
M. caudigus Sæther, 1995
M. cavicola Kieffer, 1921
M. corticalis Strenzke, 1950
M. dentipalpus Sæther, 1995
M. edwardsi Jones, 1916
M. eryngiotelmatus, Donato & Paggi, 2005
M. eurynotus (Holmgren, 1883)
M. exilacies Sæther, 1995
M. fuscipes (Meigen, 1818)
M. herbicolus Hardy, 1960
M. hirticollis (Stæger, 1839)
M. hornsbyensis Freeman, 1961
M. hygropetricus (Kieffer, 1911)
M. inopinatus Strenzke, 1950
M. intergerivus Sæther, 1995
M. knabi Coquillett, 1904
M. lacteolus Goetghebuer, 1921
M. longipennis (Holmgren, 1883)
M. obscuripes (Holmgren, 1869)
M. pankratovae Golubeva, 1980
M. perfuscus Malloch, 1934
M. picipes (Meigen, 1818)
M. polaris Kieffer, 1926
M. similis Kieffer, 1922
M. terrester Pagast, 1941
M. tristellus Edwards, 1929
M. ursinus (Holmgren, 1869)
M. wangi Sæther, 1995

References

Chironomidae
Diptera of Europe
Taxa named by Frederik Maurits van der Wulp
Nematocera genera